Corn Hollow is a valley in Ste. Genevieve County in the U.S. state of Missouri.

Corn Hollow was so named on account of the corn crop within the valley.

References

Valleys of Ste. Genevieve County, Missouri
Valleys of Missouri